Covertà is the first official EP by American heavy metal band Adrenaline Mob. It was released on March 12, 2013, in North America by  Elm City Music. As the title suggests, the EP consists entirely of cover songs. It is the first Adrenaline Mob release to feature bassist John Moyer, and the last with drummer Mike Portnoy.

Track listing

Charts

Personnel 
 Russell Allen - vocals
 Mike Orlando - guitars (bass on track 8 "The Mob Rules") 
 John Moyer - bass (except track 8)
 Mike Portnoy - drums

References 

Adrenaline Mob albums
2013 EPs
Covers EPs